Buffalo Bill, Hero of the Far West  (Buffalo Bill, l'eroe del far west) is a 1964 Italian Spaghetti Western directed by Mario Costa.

Story
Buffalo Bill is sent west by President Ulysses S. Grant to settle an Indian uprising started by Yellow Hand and supported by gun smugglers.

Cast
Gordon Scott as Colonel William "Buffalo Bill" Cody
Mario Brega as Donaldson
Jan Hendriks as Monroe
Catherine Ribeiro as Rayon-de-Lune/Moonbeam
Piero Lulli as Red
Mirko Ellis as Yellow Hand
Hans von Borsody as Captain Hunter
Roldano Lupi as Colonel Peterson
Ingeborg Schöner as Mary Peterson
Feodor Chaliapin, Jr.  as Chief White Fox
Ugo Sasso as Snack
Luigi Tosi as barman
Franco Fantasia as George, a poker player
Andrea Scotti as poker player

References

External links
 

1965 films
1965 Western (genre) films
Spaghetti Western films
Italian Western (genre) films
French Western (genre) films
West German films
1960s Italian-language films
Films scored by Carlo Rustichelli
Cultural depictions of Buffalo Bill
Films directed by Mario Costa
1960s Italian films